Eliza Stewart may refer to:

Eliza Daniel Stewart (1816–1908), early temperance movement leader in the U.S.
Eliza Stewart Udall (1855–1937), née Eliza Stewart, first telegraph operator in Arizona
Eliza Stewart Boyd (1833–1912), née Eliza Stewart, first woman to serve on a jury

See also
Elizabeth Stewart (disambiguation)